The GLAAD Media Award for Outstanding Individual Episode is one of the annual GLAAD Media Awards which is offered to the best LGBT-related episode of a television series without a regular LGBT character.

Winners and nominations

1990's

2000's

2010s

2020s

References

External links
 GLAAD Media Awards

Individual Episode